Esaias Fleischer may refer to:

 Esaias Fleischer (priest) (1633–1697), Danish priest
 Esaias Fleischer (pharmacist) (c. 1586–1663), Danish pharmacist